County Route 508 (CR 508) is a county highway in the U.S. state of New Jersey. The highway extends  from Mount Pleasant Avenue (Route 10) in Livingston to Belleville Turnpike (Route 7) in Kearny.

Route description

CR 508 begins in Livingston at the Livingston Circle, a realigned traffic circle, with State Route 10 (Mt. Pleasant Avenue) and County Route 609 (Eisenhower Parkway). As West Northfield Road, the highway travels through a primarily residential section of Livingston. This turns into a more commercial area approaching the intersection with Livingston Avenue, after which East Northfield Road goes through another residential section. At the eastern end of Livingston there is another commercial area near the intersections with County Route 527 (East Cedar Street) and Old Short Hills Road. After this the route enters West Orange; the road, now called Northfield Avenue, is lined with businesses and offices until it enters South Mountain Reservation.

After crossing over Second Watchung Mountain the route intersects with County Route 636 (Pleasant Valley Way). Beyond the intersection there are businesses on the north side, with the Richard J. Codey Arena and Turtle Back Zoo on the south side. The road then climbs up First Watchung Mountain, intersects County Route 677 (Prospect Avenue, signed as County Route 577 Spur), then heads down towards the foot of the mountain, intersecting County Route 577 (Gregory Avenue) about halfway down. At the bottom, CR 508 turns onto Whittingham Place, while Northfield Avenue finishes its run as CR 508 Spur. Eastbound traffic continues down Whittingham to Valley Road, whereas westbound traffic uses one-way Kingsley Street as a shortcut between Valley Road and Whittingham Place. CR 508 reunites on Valley Road at the south end of Kingsley Street, and then very soon turns onto Central Avenue, passing through a small industrial area before entering Orange.

The road passes under the Morristown Line and intersects County Route 638 (Scotland Road). A variety of schools, businesses, parks, churches, and houses line Central Avenue through Orange, This becomes mostly businesses as the route passes through East Orange, where it intersects County Route 605 (Evergreen Place) and County Route 509 (Grove Street). The route forms the northern edge of Fairmount Cemetery straddling the boundary between East Orange and Newark. Central Avenue passes through University Heights, which ends at Broad Street. CR 508 continues on Park Place and Center Street, passing the New Jersey Performing Arts Center. An unsigned multiplex with State Route 21 (McCarter Highway) between Center and Bridge Streets follows, at which point the route turns east onto the Bridge Street Bridge.

CR 508 crosses the Passaic River into Harrison, Hudson County, on the Bridge Street Bridge, which becomes Harrison Avenue. It intersects County Route 699 (Passaic Avenue), Interstate 280, County Route 697 (Frank E. Rodgers Blvd), and County Route 507 (Schuyler Avenue) in Harrison. The road becomes Newark Turnpike in Kearny and intersects Interstate 280 before ending at a grade-separated interchange with State Route 7, which is Belleville Turnpike west of the interchange but takes on the Newark Turnpike name east of it.

History
A road from the Passaic River to the Hudson Waterfront was completed in 1750 and named Douwe's Ferry Road, for the ferry which crossed the Hackensack River. The road between them is known as the Newark Turnpike. The like-named Newark Plank Road also connected with Hudson Waterfront with Newark following a different route.

In 1916, this road was signed as part of the William Penn Highway, which stretched from New York to Pittsburgh, PA. The route was incorporated into Route 9 in 1927, before being entirely removed by 1953. The county route was established largely along its present-day alignment in 1952, along with the other 500-series county highways.

Major intersections

Spur routes

CR 508 Spur

County Route 508 Spur (CR 508 Spur) is a  spur route in West Orange. The spur route runs on Northfield Avenue between Whittingham Place and Main Street. Signage is sporadic with one sign using "Alt" instead of "Spur."

Major intersections

CR 508 Alternate
County Route 508 Alternate (CR 508 Alt.) is a  unsigned former segment of the Newark Turnpike in Kearny. It is a two-lane wide, county-maintained access road from Route 7 eastbound serving a NJ Transit maintenance facility and other industrial companies in the Meadowlands.

See also

References

External links 

An expanded view of road jurisdiction near the confluence of I-95 / NJTurnpike, I 280, NJ 7 and CR 508 in Kearny
NJ State Highways: CR 200-514

508
508
508